Corridor is an Indian graphic novel, written and illustrated by Sarnath Banerjee, set in contemporary Delhi.  A shop owner by the name of Jehangir Rangoonwalla interacts with other residents of Delhi that all visit his shop.

Plot summary

In the heart of Lutyens' Delhi sits Jehangir Rangoonwalla, enlightened dispenser of tea, wisdom and second-hand books. Among his customers are Brighu, a postmodern Ibn Batuta looking for obscure collectibles and a love life; Digital Dutta who lives mostly in his head, torn between Karl Marx and an H-1B visa; and the newly married Shintu, looking for the ultimate aphrodisiac in the seedy by-lanes of old Delhi. Played out in the corridors of Connaught Place and Calcutta, the story captures the alienation and fragmented reality of urban life through an imaginative alchemy of text and image.

Characters
 Jehangir Rangoonwalla
 Brighu
 Digital Dutta
 Shintu

See also

Indian comics
The Barn Owl's Wondrous Capers, Sarnath Banerjee's second graphic novel

External links
A Graphic Novel from India -- ThingsAsian Article

Corridor - GraphicShelf

2004 graphic novels
Graphic novels by Sarnath Banerjee
2004 Indian novels
Comics set in India